Na végre! It was published from September 2001 until December 2009 (from 2007 on, as the only print publication for the LGBT community), until it gave way to the magazine Company.

Originally it was only available in gay bars and saunas in Budapest but from 2005 winter on it became available in all Hungary. It included a Gay Guide in English. It was published in A6 size on 16, 48 and finally 80 pages in the first four years; from 2005 September on it was published in A5 size on 40 pages.

See also 
Mások

References and external links
Its website does not work anymore, but many of its archived pages are available:
 About us

2001 establishments in Hungary
2009 disestablishments in Hungary
Defunct magazines published in Hungary
Free magazines
LGBT-related magazines published in Hungary
Hungarian-language magazines
Magazines established in 2001
Magazines disestablished in 2009
Magazines published in Budapest
Monthly magazines